Blassreiter is an anime series created and produced by Gonzo. It is directed by Ichiro Itano and written by Yasuko Kobayashi. The show had aired 24 episodes from April 5 to September 27, 2008. Blassreiter had been previously aired on TV by AT-X, Chiba TV, Sun TV, TV Kanagawa and TV Saitama. A North American release by Funimation Entertainment has been announced.

Set in the near future Germany, it portrays hideous demonic being called Demoniacs or Amalgams on the prowl on German soil attacking civilians and were said to be from the dead. The Bundezpolizei establishes an anti-Demoniac unit called the Xenogenesis Assault Team, armed with military-grade weapons and equipment to protect the German populace from Demoniacs and to spearhead anti-Demoniac operations. Individuals who are able to control the Demoniac powers and use them to fight against them on their own terms or to destroy the world are called Blassreiters.

Prior to airing of the show, GONZO Studios and Nitro+ had posted a promotional movie of Blassreiter on their website.

GRANRODEO announced on their website's information page entry dated on April 4, 2008 that the OP song of Blassreiter, "Detarame na Zanzō", would be included in their upcoming album Not for Sale, which would be released on May 14, 2008. On Aki Misato's website on 29 February 2008, she announced that she would be doing the ending song of Blassreiter, "sad rain", with a planned release of a Blassreiter ED soundtrack on May 14, 2008.

Minami Kuribayashi's song "unripe hero" is used as the opening theme from episode 15 to 24 with Kanako Itō's "A Wish for the Stars" is used as the ending theme after episode 13 right up to the end. For the final episode, the opening uses scenes from the previous episodes and the song plays the second verse and chorus instead of the first.

Episodes

See also

 Blassreiter

References

General

Specific

External links
 Blassreiter Official Site 
 Official GONZO Site 

Blassreiter